The 2022 United States House of Representatives elections in New Hampshire were held on November 8, 2022, to elect the two U.S. representatives from the state of New Hampshire, one from each of the state's two congressional districts.

Overview

District 1

The 1st district is based in southeastern New Hampshire, and includes Greater Manchester, the Seacoast and the Lakes Region. The incumbent is Democrat Chris Pappas, who was re-elected with 51.3% of the vote in 2020.

Democratic primary

Candidates

Nominee
Chris Pappas, incumbent U.S. Representative

Endorsements

Results

Republican primary

Candidates

Nominee
Karoline Leavitt, former U.S. Office of the Press Secretary staffer

Eliminated in primary
Tom Alciere, former state representative and perennial candidate
Tim Baxter, state representative
 Gail Huff Brown, news correspondent and wife of former U.S. Senator from Massachusetts Scott Brown
Mark Kilbane, businessman
Mary Maxwell
Matt Mowers, former chair of the New Hampshire Republican Party and nominee for this district in 2020
Russell Prescott, former Executive Councillor
Kevin Rondeau
Gilead Towne, sales associate

Withdrawn
Julian Acciard, security specialist and Iraq War veteran (Running for Governor)

Endorsements

Polling

Results

General election

Predictions

Polling
Aggregate polls

Graphical summary

Generic Democrat vs. generic Republican

Chris Pappas vs. generic opponent

Results

District 2

The 2nd district encompasses western and northern New Hampshire, and includes the cities of Nashua and Concord. The incumbent is Democrat Annie Kuster, who was re-elected with 53.9% of the vote in 2020.

Democratic primary

Candidates

Nominee
Annie Kuster, incumbent U.S. Representative

Endorsements

Results

Republican primary

Candidates

Nominee
Robert Burns, former Hillsborough County Treasurer

Eliminated in primary
Scott Black, Whitefield resident
Michael Callis
George Hansel, Mayor of Keene
Jay Mercer
Dean Poirier, Gulf War era veteran
Lily Tang Williams, former chair of the Colorado Libertarian Party and Libertarian nominee for U.S. Senate in Colorado in 2016

Endorsements

Polling

Results

General election

Predictions

Polling
Aggregate polls

Graphical summary

Generic Democrat vs. generic Republican

Annie Kuster vs. generic opponent

Results

Notes

Partisan clients

References

External links
 
 
  (State affiliate of the U.S. League of Women Voters)
 

Official campaign websites for 1st district candidates
 Karoline Leavitt (R) for Congress
 Chris Pappas (D) for Congress

Official campaign websites for 2nd district candidates
 Robert Burns (R) for Congress
 Annie Kuster (D) for Congress

2022
New Hampshire
United States House of Representatives